The following is a list of Australian Indigenous Australian deities and spirits.

New South Wales
Baiame, creator god of the peoples of New South Wales
Baloo, Kamilaroi moon god who keeps three pet snakes
Birrahgnooloo, Kamilaroi goddess of fertility who would send floods if properly asked to
Daramulum, sky hero and son of Baiame and Birrahngnooloo
Dirawong, Bundjalung creator being 
Ganhanbili, second wife of Baiame 
Wurrunna, culture hero
Yhi, Kamilaroi solar goddess associated with light and creation

Northern Territory
Adnoartina, the lizard guard of Uluru
Altjira, Arrernte sky god who created the earth
Ankotarinja, first man of Arrernte mythology
Onur, Karraur lunar deity
Bamapana, Yolngu trickster spirit who creates discord
Banaitja, creator deity
Barnumbirr, Yolngu creator spirit
Barraiya, creator of the first vagina
Bobbi-Bobbi, benevolent Binbinga snake deity
Djanggawul, three creator-siblings of northeast Arnhem Land mythology
Galeru, rainbow snake in Arnhem Land mythology who swallowed the Djanggawul
Djunkgao, group of sisters associated with floods and ocean currents
Julunggul, Yolngu rainbow snake goddess associated with initiation, fertility, rebirth and water
Karora, creator god
Kunapipi, a mother goddess and the patron deity of many heroes
Malingee, malignant nocturnal spirit
Mamaragan, lightning deity
Mangar-kunjer-kunja, Arrernte lizard deity who created humans
Mimi, fairy-like beings of Arnhem Land
Minawara and Multultu, legendary ancestors of the Nambutji
Namarrkon (also known as Namarrgon), Lightning man, makes lightning appear and creates roars of thunder in storms
Mokoi, evil Yolngu spirit who kidnapped and ate children
Ngintaka, Pitjantjatjara creator being
Nogomain, a god who gives spirit children to mortal parents
Manuriki, god of beauty
Papinijuwari, a type of one-eyed giant which feeds on the bodies of the dead and the blood of the sick
Tjinimin, the ancestor of the Australian peoples. He is associated with the bat and with Kunmanggur the rainbow serpent - per the Murinbata
Ulanji, snake-ancestor of the Binbinga
Wala, solar goddess
Wawalag, Yolngu sisters who were swallowed by a serpent, only to be regurgitated
Wollunqua, snake-deity associated with rain and fertility
Wuluwaid, rain god of Arnhem Land
Wuriupranili, a solar goddess whose torch is the sun
Wurugag and Waramurungundi, first man and woman of Kunwinjku legend
Yawkyawk, Aboriginal mermaids who live in waterholes, freshwater springs, and rock pools.
Yurlungur, Yolngu snake deity who swallowed and regurgitated the Wawalag sisters; associated with initiation and rebirth

Queensland
Anjea, fertility goddess or spirit, in whom people's souls reside between their incarnations
Gaiya, giant devil dingo of lower Cape York Peninsula 
Dhakhan, ancestral god of the Kabi
I'wai, culture hero of the Kuuku-Ya'u
Yalungur, god of the first baby

South Australia
Akurra, great snake deity of the Adnyamathanha people
Bila, cannibal sun goddess of the Adnyamathanha people
Bunyip, mythical creature said to lurk in swamps, billabongs, creeks, riverbeds, and waterholes
Mar'rallang, mythical twin sisters
Muldjewangk, water spirit or spirits inhabiting the Murray River
Ngintaka, Pitjantjatjara creator being
Tjilbruke, Kaurna creation ancestor

Tasmania
Moinee, Creator spirit/God for Tasmania
Droemerdene, Moinee's twin brother
Rageowrapper, malevolent spirit

Victoria
Baiame, southeast Australian creational ancestral hero
Balayang, bat deity and brother of Bunjil
Binbeal, Kulin rainbow deity and son of Bunjil
Bunjil, Kulin creator deity and ancestral being, represented as an eagle
Bunyip, mythical creature said to lurk in swamps, billabongs, creeks, riverbeds, and waterholes
Daramulum, southeast Australian deity and son of Baiame
Gnowee, solar goddess who searches daily for her lost son; her torch is the sun
Karatgurk, seven sisters who represent the Pleiades star cluster
Kondole, man who became the first whale
Lo-an-tuka, wife of Loo-errn
Loo-errn, spirit ancestor and guardian of the Brataualung people
Nargun, fierce half-human, half-stone creature of Gunai legend
Thinan-malkia, evil spirit who captures victims with nets that entangle their feet
Tiddalik, frog of southeast Australian legend who drank all the water in the land, and had to be made to laugh to regurgitate it
Waang, Kulin trickster, culture hero and ancestral being, represented as a crow
Wambeen, evil lightning-hurling figure who targets travellers

Western Australia
Bagadjimbiri, a pair of Karadjeri creator-spirits
Dilga, Karadjeri goddess of fertility and growth, and mother of the Bagadjimbiri
Julana, lecherous Jumu spirit who surprises women by burrowing beneath the sand, leaping out, and raping them
Kidili, Mandjindja moon deity who was castrated for attempting to rape the first women, who in turn became the Pleiades
Kurdaitcha (or kurdaitcha man) is a ritual "executioner" in Australian Indigenous Australian culture (specifically the term comes from the Arrernte people).
Ngariman, Karadjeri quoll-man who killed the Bagadjimbiri and was drowned in revenge
Njirana, Jumu deity and father of Julana
Ungud, snake deity associated with rainbows and the fertility and erections of the tribe's shamans
Wagyl, Noongar snakelike creator being
Wati-kutjara, a pair of western Australian lizard-men
Wondjina, Mowanjum cloud or rain spirits

Pan-continental
Rainbow Serpent, a common feature of the art and mythology of Indigenous Australian cultures
Erathipa, central Australia, a boulder that has the shape of a pregnant woman

Unknown
Kinie Ger, evil half-man, half-quoll beast
Thardid Jimbo, cannibalistic giant
Yara-ma-yha-who, monstrous bloodsucking dwarf
Bluetongue Lizard, an elderly trickster
Nogomain, a god who gives spirit children to mortal parents.
Mar'rallang, the name shared by twin sisters
Djunkgao, a group of sisters who are associated with floods and ocean currents
Yee-Na-Pah, a devil girl

Notes

References
 
 

 
Australian
Deities, Australian
Aboriginal
Mythological figures